Chelidonichthys ischyrus, is a species of marine ray-finned fishes belonging to the family Triglidae, the gurnards and sea robins. This species is endemic to Sagami Bay, Japan. The species is  TL. This species is of commercial importance as a food fish.

References

External links

Further reading

Chelidonichthys
Fish of Japan
Endemic fauna of Japan
Fish described in 1914
Taxa named by David Starr Jordan